Bence Demeter (born 19 March 1990) is a Hungarian modern pentathlete. He competed at the 2016 Summer Olympics in Rio de Janeiro, in the men's event.

References

1990 births
Living people
Hungarian male modern pentathletes
Olympic modern pentathletes of Hungary
Modern pentathletes at the 2016 Summer Olympics
World Modern Pentathlon Championships medalists